Trinity is a British television drama series which was broadcast on ITV2 from September to November 2009. The series is set in the fictional Trinity College of Bridgeford University, and stars Charles Dance, Claire Skinner, Antonia Bernath, Christian Cooke, Reggie Yates, and Isabella Calthorpe.

Premise
A new academic year begins at the ancient and prestigious Trinity College, Bridgeford University, and among the new students is Charlotte Arc (Antonia Bernath), whose father Richard Arc (Nick Sidi) was formerly a student and then professor at the college. Richard left the institution suddenly some years earlier and had never explained why, and two weeks before Charlotte is due to join the college, he is found dead in mysterious circumstances. Convinced that her father's death is in some way linked to the college, Charlotte enrolls determined to try to uncover the truth.

As Charlotte and her fellow students settle in, they begin to realise that all is not what it seems at Trinity. Beneath the glossy, glamorous veneer lurks a much darker world, governed by strict codes of conduct and secret societies, most notably the mysterious Dandelion Club whose members are among the college's wealthiest and most privileged students who are used to getting their own way.

A progressive new Warden of the college, Dr Angela Donne (Claire Skinner), is trying to modernize the institution. But she has a fight on her hands from those determined to preserve the old order, including the arrogant and sinister Dean, Dr Edmund Maltravers (Charles Dance), and the spoiled and manipulative President of the Dandelion Club, Dorian Gaudain (Christian Cooke), backed by his father, the interfering Lord Ravensby (Anthony Calf).

Besides Charlotte, the new group of students trying to find their way in the college include the streetwise and fiercely intelligent Theo Mackenzie (Reggie Yates), the poetry-loving hopeless romantic Maddy Talbot (Elen Rhys), Dorian's stunning but emotionally cold cousin Rosalind Gaudain (Isabella Calthorpe), and the lost stoners Angus (Mark Wood) and Raj (Arnab Chanda).

When the college's champion rower, Ross Bonham (David Oakes), turns up dead, a mysterious series of events begins to unfold. But those charged with protecting the secrets that lie within Trinity's ancient halls of learning aren't about to give them up without a fight.

Production
The series was filmed primarily on the campus of Royal Holloway, University of London, with most scenes taking place in or around the Founder's Building. The Founder's Building appears in the exterior shots as well as in some interior shots as the fictional Trinity College. Some interior scenes were also filmed in the Great Hall of Dulwich College in Dulwich, London. Several of the exterior scenes were also filmed at Painshill Park, a renowned 18th Century landscape garden in Cobham, Surrey.

Cast

Broadcast
The show aired weekly on Sundays at 10pm on ITV2 between 20 September 2009 and 8 November 2009, with a repeat showing on the same channel on Wednesdays at 9pm. The drama was originally planned to air at the start of the year but was delayed to allow Paris Hilton's British Best Friend to be broadcast. Trinity had its premiere online at 10pm on 13 September 2009, exactly a week before its TV premiere on 20 September 2009. Episodes 2 to 7 (with the exception of episode 3) premiered online Sundays at 11pm after the previous episode had been shown on ITV2 (episode 3 premiered online on Wednesday 30 September 2009). Episode 8 had no online premiere and was first shown on ITV2 Sunday 8 November. ITV2 repeated the entire series between 23 November 2009 and 2 December 2009 in a 9pm slot.

In 2010, it was confirmed by ITV2 Channel Director Zai Bennett that Trinity would not return for a second series.

Episodes

Home release
A three-disc DVD set was released on 9 November 2009 (BBFC Certificate 15). Special features include an exclusive behind-the-scenes feature with actors Reggie Yates and Christian Cooke.

References

External links

2009 British television series debuts
2009 British television series endings
2000s British drama television series
2000s British television miniseries
2000s college television series
British college television series
English-language television shows
ITV miniseries
ITV television dramas
Television series by Fremantle (company)
Television shows set in the United Kingdom